Ernest Poku (born 28 January 2004) is a Dutch professional footballer who plays as a forward for AZ Alkmaar.

Club career
Having joined the club from FC Amsterdam in summer 2019, he signed his first professional contract with AZ Alkmaar in February 2020, with the contract valid until mid-2023. On 30 April 2021, he made his debut for Jong AZ as a substitute in a 1–0 win over Roda JC. He trained with the club's first team during the pre-season for the 2021–22 season, and made his debut for AZ as a substitute in a 1–0 defeat to RKC Waalwijk in the opening match of the season on 14 August 2021.

International career
Born in the Netherlands, Poku is of Ghanaian descent. He made 2 appearances for the Netherlands national under-16 team in 2020. In 2022 he was named in the Dutch U19 squad. He scored his first goal for the Dutch U19 side against Ukraine U19 in June 2022.

References

External links
 Career stats - Voetbal International

2004 births
Living people
Dutch footballers
Dutch people of Ghanaian descent
Association football forwards
Jong AZ players
AZ Alkmaar players
Eredivisie players
Eerste Divisie players
Netherlands youth international footballers
Sportspeople of Ghanaian descent
FC Amsterdam players